This is a list of minister from Shürhozelie Liezietsu cabinet starting from 22 February 2017 to 19 July 2017. Shurhozelie Liezietsu is the leader of Naga People's Front was sworn in the Chief Ministers of Nagaland on 22 February 2017. The ministry had 11 Cabinet ministers including the Chief Minister. The following is the list of ministers of his ministry. The government lasted for 147 days after a coup by T. R. Zeliang.

Chief Minister & Cabinet Ministers 

 Kiyanilie Peseyie
 Yanthungo Patton
 P. Longon
 C. Kipili Sangtam
 C. L. John
 Yitachu
 P. Paiwang Konyak 
 Vikheho Swu 
 Chotisuh Sazo 
 Imkong L Imchen 
 G. Kaito Aye

References

Bharatiya Janata Party
Naga People's Front
2017 in Indian politics
Nagaland ministries
2017 establishments in Nagaland
2017 disestablishments in India
Cabinets established in 2017
Cabinets disestablished in 2017